Stephen D. Gray (born July 19, 1963 in Ottawa, Ontario) is a Canadian former rugby union player.  He played centre, and played in a total of 47 matches for Canada.  He played in the 1987, 1991 and 1995 Rugby World Cups, as well as several rugby sevens tours.
He played for Burnaby Lake Rugby Club.

References

1963 births
Living people
Canadian rugby union players
Sportspeople from Ottawa
Canada international rugby union players
Rugby union centres